Abe Harry Yourist (September 9, 1909 – November 9, 1991) was a Russian-American professional basketball player. He played for the Toledo Jim White Chevrolets in the National Basketball League in one game during the 1941–42 season. In college, Carey lettered in football, basketball, baseball, and track for Heidelberg University in Tiffin, Ohio.

Yourist was also a professional wrestler for many years, including under the pseudonyms "Pepper Gomez" and the "Masked Marvel". He retired from wrestling around 1970 and also worked for Fenton Aluminum Sash in the Seattle area for 22 years. Yourist had lived in Seattle since 1948.

References

1909 births
1991 deaths
American male professional wrestlers
American men's basketball players
Basketball players from Ohio
Centers (basketball)
College men's track and field athletes in the United States
Heidelberg Student Princes baseball players
Heidelberg Student Princes football players
Heidelberg Student Princes men's basketball players
Professional wrestlers from Ohio
Russian men's basketball players
Basketball players from Seattle
Sportspeople from Toledo, Ohio
Toledo Jim White Chevrolets players
Stampede Wrestling alumni